Nowa Karczma may refer to the following places in Poland:
Nowa Karczma, Lower Silesian Voivodeship (south-west Poland)
Nowa Karczma, Chojnice County in Pomeranian Voivodeship (north Poland)
Nowa Karczma, Gmina Kościerzyna in Pomeranian Voivodeship (north Poland)
Nowa Karczma, Gmina Nowa Karczma in Pomeranian Voivodeship (north Poland)
Nowa Karczma, Sztum County in Pomeranian Voivodeship (north Poland)
Nowa Karczma, Wejherowo County in Pomeranian Voivodeship (north Poland)
Nowa Karczma, Warmian-Masurian Voivodeship (north Poland)
Nowa Karczma, Nowy Dwór Gdański County in Pomeranian Voivodeship (north Poland)